Hugh Joseph Wade (June 29, 1901 – March 25, 1995) was an American Democratic politician who served as the first secretary of state of Alaska, serving from January 3, 1959, until December 5, 1966.

In 1959, due to the illness of Governor Bill Egan, Wade, as Secretary of State, served as acting governor of Alaska.

He was previously the territorial treasurer, serving from 1954 to January 1st, 1959.

References

External links
 Juneau-Douglas City Museum Photo of Hugh and Madge Wade with Bob Bartlett and John F. Kennedy

1901 births
1995 deaths
20th-century American politicians
Alaska Democrats
Alaska lawyers
Alaska Territory officials
Burials at Evergreen Cemetery (Juneau, Alaska)
Federal Bureau of Investigation agents
Lieutenant Governors of Alaska
People from Cerro Gordo County, Iowa
20th-century American lawyers